"Something New"  is a song recorded by South Korean singer Taeyeon. It was released on June 18, 2018, by SM Entertainment. It is the title track of Taeyeon's third EP with the same name Something New.

Reception
"Something New" debuted at number fifteen on South Korea's Gaon Digital Chart for the chart issue dated June 17–23, 2018. It additionally peaked at number 24 on the Billboard World Digital Songs chart.

Music video
On June 14, 2018, the music video teaser for the title track "Something New" was released and has attracted attention for its cinematography.

Charts

Release history

References 

2018 songs
2018 singles
SM Entertainment singles
Korean-language songs
Taeyeon songs
Songs written by Yoo Young-jin